Montana Highway 44 is a state highway in the U.S. State of Montana. The route begins at US 89 near Dupuyer and ends as Interstate 15, intersecting with former US 91 along the way.

Route description
Known as the Valier Highway, it proceeds due-east before intersecting with Original Road. A quick turn to the south east brings the intersection with Westwind Road. The highway executes another turn to the south before once again moving due-east. Shortly thereafter, an intersection with Dupuyer Cutoff Road occurs, before the highway intersects West Heights Road.

The highway enters Valier, and intersects Montana Secondary Highway 358. As it does so, it travels along the norther shore of Lake Frances. An intersection with Division Street follows, and the highway continues east. After intersecting several local roads, Montana Highway 44 intersects with former U.S. Route 91 and terminates at Interstate 15.

History
Montana Highway 44 was originally Montana Highway 216.

Major intersections

References

External links

044
Transportation in Pondera County, Montana